is a 1958 black-and-white Japanese film directed by Haku Komori and produced by Shintoho.

Cast 
 Shōji Nakayama (中山昭二)
 小畑絹子
 荒川さつき
 小倉繁
 小川虎之助

References

External links 
 http://moviedev.walkerplus.com/movie/kinejun/index.cgi?ctl=each&id=25610
 http://search.varietyjapan.com/moviedb/cinema_25610.html
 http://movie.goo.ne.jp/movies/PMVWKPD25610/

Japanese black-and-white films
1958 films
Films directed by Haku Komori
1950s Japanese films